Lindsay Ellis (born 1984/1985) is an American author, film critic, video essayist, and former YouTuber. Her debut novel, Axiom's End, published in July 2020, became a New York Times Best Seller.

Education and career
Ellis received her BA in Film Studies from New York University in 2007 and MFA from USC School of Cinematic Arts in 2011. Along with her friends Elisa Hansen and Antonella "Nella" Inserra, she wrote Awoken, a paranormal romance parody of Twilight about a woman falling in love with Cthulhu, under the alias Serra Elinsen. In 2010, she wrote and directed the documentary short film The A-Word about women's experience with abortion.

Nostalgia Chick (2008–2014) 
From 2008 to 2014, while also studying for her MFA, Ellis was selected to host The Nostalgia Chick as part of the Channel Awesome production company, a web series based on the Nostalgia Critic. She went on to create over 100 videos as part of the series before leaving in 2014 to focus more on long-form video essays.

Video essays (2014–2021) 
On her YouTube channel, Ellis frequently made videos about Walt Disney Pictures films. Other works include "The Whole Plate," a long-running series examining the Transformers film series and the work of Michael Bay which has received more than 4 million views, and a three-part series about the production of The Hobbit trilogy and its effect on the New Zealand film industry. Her Loose Canon series explores derivations of literary and film characters over time. Since 2017, her focus on her channel has been on video essays about films. Ellis says she most enjoys thinking about "things that are deeply flawed but have this really interesting potential." Her videos are created with a small team of part-time staff. In addition to covering film topics, she has also created videos on being a YouTube content creator.

Ellis also co-hosts the It's Lit! web series, alongside fellow YouTuber Princess Weekes, for PBS Digital Studios, which explores trends in American literature as a companion piece to The Great American Read on PBS itself.

The three-part documentary The Hobbit Duology (2018), which Ellis wrote and edited with Angelina Meehan, was a finalist for the 2019 Hugo Award for Best Related Work.

She was one of the founders of the Standard creator community along with Dave Wiskus, CGP Grey, Philipp Dettmer and many other creators. Through Standard, she has released most of her content on Standard's Nebula streaming video service, including an extended cut on Tom Hooper's Les Misérables. She releases content early on Patreon where she has over 9,000 patrons, making her one of the top 50 creators on the platform.

Throughout her career online, Ellis has been subject to multiple campaigns of online harassment.  One such campaign occurred after she compared the film Raya and the Last Dragon to Avatar: The Last Airbender on Twitter, which some perceived as a racist generalization of media featuring Asian people. In a 2021 Patreon blog post titled "Walking away from Omelas" (an allusion to the short story "The Ones Who Walk Away from Omelas" by Ursula K. Le Guin), she announced her retirement from YouTube and content creation, citing cancel culture and online harassment. In June 2022, Ellis resurfaced publicly at Vidcon where she discussed her life following her online retirement and the impact it had on her own mental health.
In October 2022, Ellis announced through her Patreon that, while she still intends to never return to YouTube, she will be releasing new content exclusively through Nebula, with her patrons getting free access as a Patreon perk.

Noumena (2020–present) 
In early 2020, Ellis co-founded MusicalSplaining, a podcast in which she, accompanied by director and illustrator Kaveh Taherian, discussed a different musical every two weeks. It was included in O, The Oprah Magazines top 20 new podcasts of 2020.

In 2019, Ellis announced her debut novel, Axiom's End, an alternate history set in 2007, planned as the first book in the Noumena series. It was published by St. Martin's Press on July 21, 2020, and entered The New York Times Best Seller list at number 7 on August 9, as well as appearing on the Los Angeles Times and Wall Street Journal bestseller lists. Ellis was subsequently shortlisted for the "Astounding Award for Best New Writer", which is given out during the Hugo Award ceremonies. In July 2022, Ellis made a guest appearance on MusicalSplaining. In October 2022, Ellis posted her first video essay in nearly one year on streaming platform Nebula, discussing the Lord of the Rings film trilogy. Ellis has since posted a subsequent video on that platform discussing the film  E.T. the Extra-Terrestrial.

Personal life
Ellis grew up in Johnson City, Tennessee. She is bisexual. , she and her husband live in Long Beach, California. In June 2022, it was revealed that she has a daughter.

Works
 Noumena series:
 Axiom's End (2020)
 Truth of the Divine (2021)
 Untitled third Axiom's End novel

Awards and nominations

See also
 List of LGBT YouTubers

References

External links
 
 
 Lindsay Ellis's channel on Nebula
 

1980s births
Living people
21st-century American novelists
21st-century American women writers
American YouTubers
American feminists
American film critics
American LGBT novelists
American science fiction writers
American women podcasters
American podcasters
Bisexual feminists
Bisexual women
Channel Awesome
Commentary YouTubers
LGBT YouTubers
LGBT people from Tennessee
Patreon creators
PBS people
People from Johnson City, Tennessee
Pseudonymous women writers
Tisch School of the Arts alumni
USC School of Cinematic Arts alumni
Victims of cyberbullying
Video essayists
American women film critics
Women science fiction and fantasy writers
Writers from Tennessee
YouTube channels launched in 2013
YouTube critics and reviewers
20th-century American LGBT people
21st-century LGBT people
21st-century pseudonymous writers